Cyriacus Spangenberg (7 June 1528 – 10 February 1604) was a German theologian, Protestant reformer and historian, son of the reformer  (1484–1550).

Cyriacus was born in Nordhausen.  As a student, he was a fellow tenant of Martin Luther in Wittenberg, later became a minister in Eisleben, and in 1559 the General Dean of the Grafschaft Mansfeld.

In January 1575, he lost his place at Mansfeld because in the Flacian controversy he sided with Matthias Flacius. Along with Flacius, he taught that through original sin some of the substantial faculties of men were also corrupted. This contradicted the doctrine of his opponents that only accidental faculties were depraved. He served as a pastor at Schlitz, Hesse from 1580 until getting expelled in 1590. After getting expelled, he went on a short retreat to Vacha before moving to Strassburg, where his youngest son, a celebrated poet, lived, and where he died. Among the last pupils of Luther, Spangenberg is the most prominent.

He wrote about 150 works. As a historian he wrote Mansfeldi Chronica, Saxonian Chronica, and other publications. His Adelsspiegel is probably the most important early-modern aristocracy treatise. Also he wrote How Husbands Ought to Behave and What every Christian should make...Confession of Faith.

References
Jacobs, Henry Eyster. “Spangenberg, Cyriacus.” Lutheran Cyclopedia. New York: Scribner, 1899. p. 450.
Spangenberg, Cyriacus, article from Christian Cyclopedia
Cyriac Family History Project Cyriacus Spangenberg page
etching of M. CYRIACVS SPANGENBERGIVS (1528 - 1604)

External links 

 
 
 Sf – Sz Analytic Bibliography of Online Neo-Latin Texts

1528 births
1604 deaths
People from Nordhausen, Thuringia
German Lutheran theologians
German Lutheran hymnwriters
16th-century German Protestant theologians
16th-century German Lutheran clergy
German male non-fiction writers
16th-century German male writers